Samuel von Brukenthal National College is a German-language high school founded in Nagyszeben, Transylvania, Kingdom of Hungary (today in Sibiu, Romania). The school is named after Samuel von Brukenthal, governor of the Grand Principality of Transylvania between 6 July 1774 and 9 January 1787. The earliest record of the school is from 1380, making it the oldest German-language school in Romania. The current school building was built between 1779 and 1786 on the site of an earlier school, and is classified as a historical monument with LMI code SB-II-m-A-12082.

Notable alumni
 Septimiu Albini (1861–1919), journalist and political activist
 Romulus Cândea (1886–1973), ecclesiastical historian
 Dimitrie Comșa (1846–1931), agronomist and political activist
 Arthur Coulin (1869–1912), painter and art critic
 Klaus Johannis, President of Romania (2014–present)
  (1897–1971), theologian and writer
  (1884–1969), historian and theologian
 Rubin Patiția (1841–1918), lawyer and political activist
 Daniil Popovici-Barcianu (1847–1903), teacher, naturalist, and political activist
 Arthur Arz von Straußenburg (1857–1935), Chief of the General Staff of the Austro-Hungarian Army
 Viorel Tilea (1896–1972), diplomat

External links

Official website

Historic monuments in Sibiu County
Educational institutions established in the 14th century
National Colleges in Romania
German-language schools
Schools in Sibiu County
Education in Sibiu
School buildings completed in 1786